Luděk Šeller (born 11 July 1995) is a Czech cross-country skier. He competed in the sprint at the 2022 Winter Olympics.

Cross-country skiing results
All results are sourced from the International Ski Federation (FIS).

Olympic Games

Distance reduced to 30 km due to weather conditions.

World Championships

World Cup

Season standings

References

External links

1995 births
Living people
Czech male cross-country skiers
Cross-country skiers at the 2022 Winter Olympics
Olympic cross-country skiers of the Czech Republic
People from Domažlice
Sportspeople from the Plzeň Region